Gederot Regional Council (Mo'atza Azorit Gderot) is a regional council in the Central District of Israel. It is located between Ashdod, Yavne and Gedera and covers an area of 13,000 dunams. Founded in 1953, it was named after a biblical town in the allotment of the tribe of Judah (Joshua 15:41) Its population is 4,200.

It borders on Brenner Regional Council to the north, Hevel Yavne Regional Council to the west, Be'er Tuvia Regional Council and Gan Yavne to the south, and the city of Gedera to the east.

List of settlements
The council includes six moshavim and one community settlement:
Aseret (community settlement)
Gan HaDarom (moshav)
Kfar Aviv (moshav)
Kfar Mordechai (moshav)
Meishar (moshav)
Misgav Dov (moshav)
Shdema (moshav)

References

External links
 

 
Regional councils in Israel
Central District (Israel)